Phycosecidae is a family of beetles in the superfamily Cleroidea., containing the single genus Phycosecis found in Australia, New Caledonia, New Zealand and Vanuatu. The beetles are small, about 1.5–3.5 mm in length. They live in sandy coastal areas, and are saprophagous, feeding on faeces, carrion, and death arthropods during the daytime.

Taxonomy 
The species are:

 Phycosecis ammophilus Lea, 1899
 Phycosecis hilli Lea, 1921
 Phycosecis limbata (Fabricius, 1781)
 Phycosecis litoralis Pascoe, 1875

References

Cleroidea
Polyphaga families
Monogeneric insect families